Cloverdale Creek is a stream in Hidalgo County, New Mexico.

References

Rivers of Hidalgo County, New Mexico
Rivers of New Mexico
Cooke's Wagon Road